Pedro Luís Vicençote (born 22 October 1957), best known as Pedrinho, is a Brazilian former footballer who played as a defender.

He played for Palmeiras (1977–1981), Vasco da Gama (1981–1983 and 1986), Bangu (1987–1988) and in Italian Serie A with Catania (1983–1985). He won two Rio de Janeiro State Championship in 1982 and 1987.

For the Brazil national football team he got 13 international caps (one goal scored), from July 1979 to June 1983, and was in the squad for the 1982 FIFA World Cup, although without playing a game during the tournament.

After retiring, he also worked as a football agent, and was known as Pedrinho VRP.

References

External links
    
 

1957 births
Living people
People from Santo André, São Paulo
Brazilian footballers
Brazil international footballers
Brazilian expatriate footballers
Expatriate footballers in Italy
Association football defenders
Sociedade Esportiva Palmeiras players
CR Vasco da Gama players
Bangu Atlético Clube players
Catania S.S.D. players
Campeonato Brasileiro Série A players
Serie A players
Serie B players
1982 FIFA World Cup players
1979 Copa América players
Brazilian football agents
Footballers from São Paulo (state)